In botany and horticulture, an offset (also called a pup) is a small, virtually complete daughter plant that has been naturally and asexually produced on the mother plant. They are clones, meaning that they are genetically identical to the mother plant. They divide mitotically. In the plant nursery business and gardens, they are detached and grown in order to produce new plants. This is a cheap and simple process for those plants that readily produce offsets as it does not usually require specialist materials and equipment.

An offset or pup may also be used as a broad term to refer to any short shoot originating from the ground at the base of another shoot.

Offsets form when meristem regions of plants, such as axillary buds or homologous structures, differentiate into a new plant with the ability to become self-sustaining.  This is particularly common in species that develop underground storage organs, such as bulbs, corms and tubers. Tulips and lilies are examples of plants that display offset characteristics by forming cormlets around the original mother corm.

It is a means of plant propagation. When propagating plants to increase a stock of a cultivar, thus seeking identical copies of parent plant, various cloning techniques (asexual reproduction) are used. Offsets are a natural means by which plants may be cloned.

In contrast, when propagating plants to create new cultivars, sexual reproduction through pollination is used to create seeds.  The recombination of genes gives rise to offspring plant with similar but distinct offspring genome.

References 

Plants